Fuberidazole (chemical formula: C11H8N2O) is a chemical compound used in fungicides.

References

Benzimidazoles
2-Furyl compounds
Fungicides